Abortion in the Northern Mariana Islands is illegal by legislation, but legal by judicial ruling and legal review. A law passed in 1985 made abortion illegal, but a review by the Attorney General said it was legal in 1995. Women in the 1990s went to the Philippines to get abortions, but went to Japan or Hawaii by 2018 because of changing legality in the region.

History 
During the 1990s, women who wanted abortions often traveled to the Philippines to get an abortion as there were no legal options in the Marianas. Women had few options to where they could get a legal abortion including Hawaii or Japan.

Legislative history 

Abortion in the Commonwealth of the Northern Mariana Islands, a United States territory, is illegal per 11 TTC § 51, which states:Every person who shall unlawfully cause the miscarriage or premature delivery of a woman, with the intent to do so, shall be guilty of abortion and upon conviction thereof shall be imprisoned for a period of not more than five years. (Code 1966, § 405; Code 1970, tit. 11, § 51.)

This was reaffirmed with the Northern Marianas Constitution in Article 12's May 1986 supplement, which said, "The abortion of the unborn child during the mother's pregnancy is prohibited by the Commonwealth of the Northern Mariana Islands, except as provided by law." This measure was adopted in 1985.  It was still in place in 2018.

In 2000, the law was debated after Gov. Pedro P. Tenorio asked the attorney general to review the constitutionality of the 1985 law, but having the discussion immediately met resistance from the Marianas' Roman Catholic majority.

Judicial history 
In a 1971 case, Trust Territory v. Tarkong, the Appellate Court of the Trust Territory (see also United States territorial court) held:As far as the woman herself is concerned, unless the abortion statute expressly makes her responsible, it is generally held, although the statute reads any "person", that she is not liable to any criminal prosecution, whether she solicits the act or performs it upon herself.
Tension has existed between Interpretations of U.S. federal law up against local Commonwealth law.  However, a recent governor has asserted that until either U.S. federal or local Commonwealth courts state otherwise, or unless the Commonwealth government carves out any legal allowances, abortion remains illegal in all circumstances in the Commonwealth. In 1995, the Attorney General said that constitutionally, women have a legal right to an abortion. In practice, abortions to save the life of the mother or when pregnancy is the result of rape or incest occur without prosecution.

Financing 
In 1998, the only reason an abortion would be eligible for public funding is if it was a result of rape or incest, or if continuing the pregnancy would endanger the life of the woman. This policy had been in place since April 19, 1994, and related mostly to Medicaid funding.

References 

Northern Mariana Islands law
Society of the Northern Mariana Islands
Northern Mariana Islands
Northern Mariana Islands
Northern Mariana
Health in the Northern Mariana Islands
Women in the Northern Mariana Islands